Franz Beck (4 March 1930 – 5 October 2000) was a Liechtensteiner alpine skier who competed in the 1948 Winter Olympics and in the 1956 Winter Olympics.

References

External links
 

1930 births
2000 deaths
Liechtenstein male alpine skiers
Olympic alpine skiers of Liechtenstein
Alpine skiers at the 1948 Winter Olympics
Alpine skiers at the 1956 Winter Olympics